Duberria lutrix, or the common slug eater, is a small, ovoviviparous, molluscivorous, non-venomous snake, which is endemic to Africa.

Description
Adults can be up to thirty to forty cm (approximately twelve to sixteen inches).

The common slug eater's colour can vary, but they typically have an olive green to brown or russet back, grey flanks, a yellowish or cream belly, and a black, more or less complete, vertebral stripe.

Geographic range
This species is found in Burundi, Democratic Republic of the Congo, Eswatini, Ethiopia, Kenya, Mozambique, Rwanda, South Africa, Tanzania, Uganda, and Zimbabwe.

Subspecies
Six subspecies are recognized, including the nominotypical subspecies.

 Duberria lutrix abyssinica (Boulenger, 1894)
 Duberria lutrix atriventris Sternfeld, 1912
 Duberria lutrix basilewskyi Skelton-Bourgeois, 1961
 Duberria lutrix currylindahli Laurent, 1956
 Duberria lutrix lutrix (Linnaeus, 1758)
 Duberria lutrix rhodesiana Broadley, 1958

Diet

As the name implies, the common slug eater is a specialised predator and feeds on snails and slugs, mostly finding its prey through chemoreception, using its tongue.  It swallows its prey quickly before too much defensive mucus is produced, extracting snails from their shells through the shell opening, or by smashing the shell against a rock while grasping the soft body in its jaws.

Breeding
The common slug eater usually gives birth to litters of three to twelve young. However, broods from large females may consist of as many as 22 newborns, each measuring eight to eleven cm (3⅛-4¼ inches). The total combined weight of the young may exceed the weight of the female after giving birth. Birthing season is January and February (late summer in southern Africa).

Captivity
The snake is a popular pet, which feeds and breeds readily, and because of the nature of its prey item, it is easy to keep.

Defense
When alarmed, the snake secretes a noxious substance from glands near the base of the tail and rolls up into a defensive spiral with the head in the middle, leading to the Afrikaans common name  ("tobacco roll").

References

Pseudoxyrhophiidae
Reptiles described in 1758
Taxa named by Carl Linnaeus